The Master is a 2012 American psychological drama film written and directed by Paul Thomas Anderson and starring Joaquin Phoenix, Philip Seymour Hoffman, and Amy Adams.

The film premiered at the Venice Film Festival on September 1, 2012, where it won the FIPRESCI Award for Best Film. In addition, Anderson won the Silver Lion for Best Director and both Phoenix and Hoffman won the Volpi Cup for Best Actor at the festival. The Master was released in theaters in the United States on September 14, 2012, to critical acclaim; its performances (particularly those from the three leads), screenplay, direction, plausibility, and realistic portrayal of post-World War II Americans were praised.

Considered one of Anderson's finest works and one of the best films of the 2010s, it received several award nominations. For their performances, the three leads Phoenix, Hoffman and Adams all received awards from multiple critics groups as well as nominations at the Academy Awards, British Academy Film Awards, and Golden Globe Awards. Hoffman was additionally nominated at the Screen Actors Guild Awards. For his direction and writing, Anderson also won multiple critics awards and received nominations for best original screenplay at the British Academy Film Awards and Writers Guild of America Awards

Accolades

References

External links
 

Lists of accolades by film